Karous (カラス, karasu, "raven") is a vertical-scrolling shooter video game developed by Milestone Inc. for the Sega NAOMI platform and released in Japanese arcades on November 15, 2006. The game was later ported to the Sega Dreamcast, becoming the system's last officially licensed title when it was released in Japan on March 8, 2007.

Gameplay 
The weapon system is based on Radio Allergy, but it uses a unique D.F.S. bomb system.

Bombs can be used when SP gauge is full. When a bomb is activated, a barrier surrounds the player, which can damage enemies within the barrier. For the duration of bomb activation, the player is invulnerable. Enemies destroyed by the barrier provide more experience points to the player.

The player's shot, sword, shield can be upgraded by using experience items dropped from enemies, with a maximum of 100 levels. Weapon levels also act as score multipliers.

Characters 
Karous (カラス) – Player's ship pilot
Shigi (シギ) – Navigator
Akahara (アカハラ(赤原))
Hakugan (ハクガン(剥眼))

Milestone Shooting Collection Karous Wii 
On April 8, 2008, a Nintendo Wii version of the game was released in Japan, titled Milestone Shooting Collection: Karous Wii. The collection includes both Radirgy and Chaos Field as extras. This collection was released in the United States in February 2009 by UFO Interactive Games under the name Ultimate Shooting Collection.

Reception 
Famitsu gave the Dreamcast version a review of  6, 6, 6, 7, while Edge gave it 6 out of 10. The game marks the last official third-party release for the Dreamcast platform.

References

External links 
Milestone page (in Japanese)
Sega arcade page
Sega Dreamcast page
Demo video of the game

2006 video games
Sega arcade games
Dreamcast games
Nintendo 3DS games
Nintendo 3DS eShop games
Video games featuring female protagonists
Video games about revenge
Vertically scrolling shooters
Sega video games
Video games developed in Japan
Single-player video games
MileStone Inc. games